John J. Mack (born November 17, 1944) is a senior advisor to the investment firm Kohlberg Kravis Roberts and the former CEO and chairman of the board at Morgan Stanley, the New York-based investment bank and brokerage firm.

Early life and education 
Mack was born in Mooresville, North Carolina, the son of Alice (née Azouri) and Charles Mack. Mack's father's original family name was Makhoul; he came to the United States from Lebanon when he was 12 years old, following Mack's grandfather, who had arrived at Ellis Island in 1909.

The family settled in North Carolina. Mack's father ran a wholesale grocery, clothing, and general merchandise store called John Mack & Son in Mooresville, North Carolina. The business occupied The John Mack Building from 1937 to the 1990s. Mack is the youngest of six sons. The family was Catholic.

In 1968, Mack graduated from Duke University, where he attended on a football scholarship and majored in history. Mack's first job in finance was as a clerk at a small brokerage house during his junior year at Duke, after a cracked vertebra made it impossible for him to continue on his football scholarship.

Career

Morgan Stanley 
Mack worked at several firms around Wall Street before starting his career at Morgan Stanley in 1972 as a salesman, and has since worked for the company for nearly thirty years. Rising steadily to positions of increasing responsibility, Mack eventually headed the firm's Worldwide Taxable Fixed Income Division from 1985 to 1992. In 1987, he became a member of the board of directors. In March 1992, he assumed responsibility for Morgan Stanley's day-to-day operations as chairman of the operating committee. He was named president of Morgan Stanley in June 1993. Mack served as president, chief operating officer and a director of Morgan Stanley Dean Witter & Co. from May 1997 when the firm was created by the merger of Morgan Stanley and Dean Witter, two of the world's leading financial services companies.

In 2001, Mack left Morgan Stanley after a power struggle with Phil Purcell; Purcell became CEO of Morgan Stanley after the 1997 merger of Morgan Stanley and Dean Witter, of which Purcell was already CEO.

Credit Suisse 
Six months later, in June 2001, Mack was hired as CEO of Credit Suisse, then known as Credit Suisse First Boston (CSFB). Mack's time at Credit Suisse was marked much restructuring and by compliances issues created by Frank Quattrone's Technology Group.

Morgan Stanley redux 
On June 30, 2005, Mack returned to Morgan Stanley as chief executive officer and chairman of the board, replacing Purcell. Mack was noted for stabilizing the firm and reenergizing its culture and client franchise, despite an economic downturn.

Mack announced his retirement as chief executive officer on September 10, 2009, which was effective January 1, 2010. In 2011, Mack retired from Morgan Stanley after more than 30 years as an investment banker. Former co-president James P. Gorman succeeded him as CEO.

Kohlberg Kravis Roberts 
In 2012, Mack joined Kohlberg Kravis Roberts as a senior advisor.

Rosneft 
In 2013 Mack joined Rosneft, the Russian, state-owned, oil company that has BP as an investor of approximately 20%. In 2014 he announced his departure, shortly after the CEO Igor Sechin had sanctions imposed upon him by the US. Different reasons were given for his departure; Mack said his contract had only been for a year, while Rosneft spokespeople said he had decided to leave for personal reasons.

Insider trading accusations 
In 2006, Mack was accused by former SEC investigator Gary J. Aguirre of insider trading. On October 5, 2006, the SEC recommended no action be taken against Mack. In late November 2006, Mack and Pequot were notified that the investigation had been closed and no action would be taken against them.

Compensation
While CEO of Morgan Stanley in 2006, Mack earned a total compensation of $41,399,010, which included a base salary of $800,000, stocks granted of $36,179,923, and options granted of $4,019,934.

In 2008, he earned a total compensation of $1,235,097, which included a base salary of $800,000 and other compensation of $435,097. He did not receive any cash, stock, or options.

In 2014, Mack defended the high fees paid to CEOs, saying on Bloomberg Television that the discussion of compensation was healthy, but that CEOs earn the rates.

Financial crisis of 2007–2008
Mack guided the firm through the financial crisis of 2007–2008, building its capital position and overseeing the firm's conversion to a bank holding company. To stabilize the firm, he forged strategic alliances with China Investment Corporation and Mitsubishi UFJ Group and entered into a joint venture with Smith Barney, forming at the time the world's largest wealth management firm. During the crisis, Mack was advised by U.S. Treasury Secretary Hank Paulson and the head of the Federal Reserve Bank Ben Bernanke to sell Morgan Stanley. He has stated that during negotiations he was under considerable pressure from the president of the New York Federal Reserve, Tim Geithner, to sell or merge Morgan Stanley to one of his competitors such as JP Morgan. Mack saw this as being contrary to the interests of Morgan Stanley shareholders and employees, similar to the demise of Bear Stearns in a forced sale to JP Morgan for $2 per share, (the deal was later revised to $10 a share), and insisted on finding other sources of financing instead.

Board memberships 
 New York-Presbyterian Hospital: Chairman Emeriti, Board of Trustees  
 Duke University: board of trustees
 University Hospital of Columbia University: board member
 University Hospital of Cornell University: board member
 IMG: director
 Bloomberg Family Foundation: board member
 Business Council: member
 Business Roundtable: member
 China Investment Corporation: International Advisory Council
 Mayor of Beijing: International Business Leaders Advisory Council
 Monetary Authority of Singapore: international advisory panel
 Partnership for New York City: executive committee, director
 November 2011: Rev Worldwide: board of directors
 2012: LendingClub: board member

Philanthropy 
Mack has donated to various entities through the Christy and John Mack Foundation, formerly known as C.J. Mack Foundation:
 1999: Duke University: $10 million to support various initiatives
 2004: Duke University: $10 million to support integrative medicine
 2005: United States Naval Academy Foundation: Endowment to support the Admiral Frank Bowman Scholar Program
 2007: Shaw University: $5 million to support academic scholarships to this historically black college

Mack has sat on the board of trustees of NewYork–Presbyterian Hospital since 1992.  He was chairman of the board for 5 years and was integral to the funding and construction of NYP Morgan Stanley Children's Hospital,  the only stand-alone children's hospital in New York City.

In media 
Mack earned the nickname "Mack the Knife" for his cost-cutting prowess while managing the fixed income division at Morgan Stanley, and he lived up to his billing at CSFB, where he cut 10,000 jobs and returned the bank to profitability.

Mack was portrayed in the HBO film Too Big to Fail by Tony Shalhoub and in the BBC film The Last Days of Lehman Brothers by Henry Goodman. His career is also covered in detail in a 2007 book by Patricia Beard, Blue Blood and Mutiny: The Fight for the Soul of Morgan Stanley. The 2010 documentary Plunder: The Crime of Our Time by Danny Schechter opens with a demonstration outside his home by people who lost their houses in the Great Recession.

Mack's personal memoire and career retrospective, "Up Close and All in: Life Lessons from a Wall Street Warrior," was published by Simon & Schuster in October 2022.

Selected interviews 
 Mack, John. "Wharton Leadership Lecture: John Mack on Saving Morgan Stanley, Inside the Bunker." Knowledge at Wharton. University of Pennsylvania. October 14, 2009.
 Mack, John and Hank Paulson. "Mack, Paulson full interview." CNN Money. NYU Stern School of Business. March 2010.
 Rose, Charlie. "Zhou Wenzhong; John Mack, Chairman, Morgan Stanley; Kenneth Roth on Human Rights in China; An appreciation of Reynolds Price." Charlie Rose. January 20, 2011. Interview starts at 25:30.

Personal life 
Mack is married to Christy Mack (née King). Mr and Mrs. Mack reside in New York City. They have three children.

References

Further reading 
 United States. Congress. Senate. Committee on the Judiciary, and United States. Congress. Senate. Committee on Finance. "The Firing of an SEC Attorney and the Investigation of Pequot Capital Management." Washington: U.S. G.P.O., August 2007.  
 Beard, Patricia. Blue Blood and Mutiny: The Fight for the Soul of Morgan Stanley. New York: Harper Perennial, 2008.  
 Mack, John J. "Testimony of John J. Mack Chairman and Chief Executive Officer, Morgan Stanley before the United States House of Representatives Committee on Financial Services." February 11, 2009.
 

1944 births
Living people
American people of Lebanese descent
American chief executives of financial services companies
Duke University Trinity College of Arts and Sciences alumni
Lebanese businesspeople
American bankers
People from Mooresville, North Carolina
Credit Suisse people
Glencore people